The Social Renewal Party (Partido de Renovação Social) is a political party in Angola. The party was founded in 1991. It is mainly based within the Chokwe ethnic group. In the 1992 elections it won six seats.

In 1999 the party passed through a period of inner strife, in which four MPs were expelled from the party.

The PRS won 3.17% of the vote in the September 2008 parliamentary election, winning eight seats out of 220 seats. It performed particularly well in Lunda Sul and Lunda Norte provinces, although it still placed second behind the governing Popular Movement for the Liberation of Angola (MPLA) in those provinces.

The youth wing of the party is Social Renewal Youth (JURS).

Electoral history

Presidential elections

National Assembly elections

References

External links 
  

1991 establishments in Angola
Federalist parties
Liberal parties in Angola
Political parties established in 1991
Political parties in Angola
Progressive parties